Oxe may refer to:

People
 Peder Oxe (1520–1575), Danish finance minister
 Torben Oxe (died 1517), Danish nobleman
 Inger Oxe (c. 1526-1591), Danish noble lady

See also
 Ox, draft animal
 Omega Chi Epsilon (sometimes simplified to OXE), American college honor society